Stavropoleos Monastery, also known as Stavropoleos Church during the last century when the monastery was dissolved, is an Eastern Orthodox monastery for nuns in central Bucharest, Romania. Its church is built in Brâncovenesc style. The patrons of the church (the saints to whom the church is dedicated) are St. Archangels Michael and Gabriel. The name Stavropoleos is the genitive case of Stavropolis (Greek, "The city of the Cross"). One of the monastery's constant interests is Byzantine music, expressed through its choir and the largest collection of Byzantine music books in Romania.

History

The church was built in 1724, during the reign of Nicholas Mavrocordatos (Prince of Wallachia, 1719-1730), by the archimandrite Ioannikios Stratonikeas, a Greek monk from Pogoniani. Within the precinct of his inn, Ioannikios built the church, and a monastery which was economically sustained with the incomes from the inn (a relatively common situation in those times). In 1726 abbot Ioannikios was elected metropolitan of Stavropolis and exarch of Caria. Since then the monastery he built is named Stavropoleos, after the name of the old seat. On February 7, 1742 Ioannikios, aged 61, died and was buried in his church.

The inn and the monastery's annexes were demolished at the end of 19th century. Over time the church suffered from earthquakes, which caused the dome to fall. The dome's paintings were restored at the beginning of the 20th century.

All that remains from the original monastery is the church, alongside a building from the beginning of the 20th century which shelters a library, a conference room and a collection of old (early 18th century) icons and ecclesiastical objects, and parts of wall paintings recovered from churches demolished during the communist regime. This new building was constructed following the plans of architect Ion Mincu.

The church has been pastored since 1991 by father Iustin Marchiș, the first hieromonk of the church in the last century. The community living here, besides routine worship, is engaged in renovating old books, icons and sacerdotal clothes. The choir of the church sings (neo-)Byzantine music (a single voice part, sustained by a prolonged sound called ison - approx. translation: accompaniment -, or tonic note), now a rare occurrence for churches in Romania.

Library

The monastery's library has over 8000 books of theology, byzantine music, arts and history. There are patristic, biblical, dogmatic, liturgic, historical, homiletic, catechetic writings, classic languages dictionaries and textbooks, studies on Byzantine art and Orthodox iconography, and on the Romanian history and civilization of the 18th century. Some of the books are from the donated personal library of art historian Vasile Drăguț, former rector of the Bucharest University of Arts.

There is a significant number of old books: more than 80 manuscripts and 400 printed works. There are Romanian, Greek, and Church Slavonic books.

The Byzantine music books collection is the largest in Romania, and consists mostly of the donations of two Romanian byzantologists, Sebastian Barbu-Bucur, and Titus Moisescu.

The monastery has started a virtual library project by digitizing its old books.

Psaltic group
The music sung during the offices is neo-Byzantine, based on the works of 19th century Romanian psalmodists: Macarie the Hieromonk, Nectarie the Hermit, Anton Pann, Dimitrie Suceveanu, Greek chants translated into Romanian, or modern compositions.

The Stavropoleos Byzantine Choir was created in 1994, and is led by archdeacon Gabriel Constantin Oprea who officiates and chants at the Stavropoleos Church and teaches Byzantine music at the National University of Music Bucharest. The group has performed in Romania and abroad, and they are issuing their music on CDs.

Gallery

See also
 Depiction of a typical Orthodox Church building
 Romanian Orthodox Church

References

External links
 Stavropoleos Church homepage: www.stavropoleos.ro 
 Byzantine music sung by Stavropoleos choir (downloadable mp3 files at the bottom of the page) 

Churches completed in 1724
Romanian Orthodox churches in Bucharest
Historic monuments in Bucharest
Monasteries in Bucharest
Christian monasteries established in the 18th century
1724 establishments in the Ottoman Empire
Lipscani
Brâncovenesc style architecture